The 2021–22 Everton F.C. (women) season was the club's fifth consecutive campaign in the FA Women's Super League, the highest level of the football pyramid. Along with competing in the WSL, the club also contested two domestic cup competitions: the FA Cup and the League Cup.

After a poor start to the season, Everton sacked manager Willie Kirk on 16 October 2021. Kirk had been in charge since December 2018. Jean-Luc Vasseur, who had last been in charge of Olympique Lyon until his sacking in April 2021, was announced as his replacement on 29 October. Having taken over the team in 8th, Vasseur was sacked on 2 February after 10 games in charge with the team in 10th and eliminated from the League Cup at the group stage. Chris Roberts and Claire Ditchburn were named as interim managers.

Squad

Preseason

FA Women's Super League

Results summary

Results by matchday

Results

League table

Women's FA Cup 

As a member of the first tier, Everton entered the FA Cup in the fourth round proper.

FA Women's League Cup

Group stage

Squad statistics

Appearances 

Starting appearances are listed first, followed by substitute appearances after the + symbol where applicable.

|-
|colspan="14"|Players who appeared for the club but left during the season:

|}

Transfers

Transfers in

Transfers out

Loans out

References 

Everton F.C. (women) seasons
Everton